West Jefferson is the name of several communities in the United States of America:
West Jefferson, Alabama
West Jefferson, North Carolina
West Jefferson, Ohio, a village
West Jefferson, Williams County, Ohio, an unincorporated community